Ljubinka Bobić (2 January 1897 – 3 December 1978) was a Yugoslav actress. She appeared in more than fifteen films from 1951 to 1975.

Biography
She was born in Kruševac in a poor family with five children. Her brother Miroljub Bobić, a teacher, is one of 1300 Corporals and a holder of Alban memorial. Her father, Vladislav, a cobbler, was from Srem (Sremski Golubinci), and her mother Jelisaveta was from Macedonia (Struga). They moved to Topčider hill where Ljubinka grew up. Theatre attracted her and with her persistence she became a member of the National Theatre group. Her talent was discovered by Branislav Nušić in 1915 in Skopje where she had been sent to live with her relatives during World War I.

Although she never married, she was romantically involved with the director of "Politika" newspaper Vlada Ribnikar, writer Miloš Crnjanski and Rade Drainac. She was buried in the Alley of deserving citizens on the New Graveyard in Belgrade. A stamp with her silhouette was published in 2003. "Ljubinka Bobić" award was established in 2006.

Selected filmography

Literary work
Bobić wrote a few popular humoristic satirical pieces:

Our manners: comedy in three acts, 1935.
Classy society, innocuous comedy in three acts, 1936.
Blo family, comedy in three acts, 1940.

Awards

Golden arena in 1957. for the best female role in the movie "Priest Ćira and priest Spira"
7 July award of SR Serbia
Golden turkey 
Award for life's work in 1961.

Legacy
A street is named after her in New Belgrade, Bežanija, as well in Jakovo and Lazarice near Kruševac. Prominent theatre acting award, Ljubinka Bobić Award is given in her honour.

Literature
Stojković S.B. (1983). Great people in Serbian theatre. Belgrade: Serbian literary cooperatives – Valjevo: Milić Rakić
Dimitrijević К. (2011). Three of the greatest Serbian actors behind the scene: Milivoje Živanović, Raša Plaović, Ljubinka Bobić. Belgrade: Prosveta.
Dimitrijević К. (1994). Anti-biography Ljubinka Bobić. Theatron, 18, 85-107.

References

External links 

Muzej Ljubinke Bobić
Gospođa ministarka: Ljubinka Bobić (insert)
Gospođa ministarka: Predstava (premiere 11.07.1966 - DEO 01/02)	
Ljubinka Bobić: Glumacka legenda vragolastog oka

1897 births
1978 deaths
Actors from Kruševac
Yugoslav actresses
Golden Arena winners